The International Middle East Media Center (or IMEMC) is an independent news organization run by Palestinians living in the Palestinian territories, working together with international journalists, who report on events in both Israel and the Palestinian territories. The IMEMC is published in English so that an international audience has access to reports on events in the region as reported directly by local journalists.

They report with a heavy pro pallastinain bias, and are often seen as a mindless anti-Israel blog.

See also
The Electronic Intifada
Independent Media Center

Further reading

External links
 http://www.imemc.org/

 
Mass media in the State of Palestine
Alternative journalism organizations